Tyler is an unincorporated community in Pemiscot County, in the U.S. state of Missouri.

History
A post office called Tyler was established in 1891, and remained in operation until 1954. The community has the name of H. A. Tyler, a businessperson in the lumber industry.

References

Unincorporated communities in Pemiscot County, Missouri
Unincorporated communities in Missouri